808 is a 2015 American documentary film directed by Alexander Dunn, written by Dunn and Luke Bainbridge, and produced by Alex Noyer, Dunn, Craig Kallman and Arthur Baker. It is narrated by Zane Lowe and documents the history and culture of the Roland TR-808, a drum machine that had a significant effect on hip hop and pop music.

808 premiered at South by Southwest (SXSW) on March 13, 2015. It was released on Apple Music exclusively on December 9, 2016, and was released for iTunes on December 16 by Atlantic Films.

Cast 
The film features appearances from Afrika Bambaataa, A Guy Called Gerald, Armand Van Helden, Arthur Baker, A-Trak, Beastie Boys, Bernard Sumner, Chris Barbosa, Chris Frantz, Damon Albarn, David and Stephen Dewaele, David Guetta, David Noller, Diplo, DJ Mr. Mixx, Fatboy Slim, Felix da Housecat, François Kevorkian, Goldie, Graham Massey, Hank Shocklee, Ian Lewis, Ikutaro Kakehashi, John Benitez, Jim Jonsin, Jimmy Jam, Jori Hulkkonen, Lady Tigra, Lil Jon, Man Parrish, Mike Butcher, Mr. Biggs, Papa Wheelie, Pharrell Williams, Phil Collins, Pretty Tony, Questlove, Remi Kabaka, Richie Hawtin, Rick Rubin, Stephen Morris, Strafe, T La Rock, Terry Lewis, The G.L.O.B.E., Tiga, Todd Terry, Tom Silverman and Tony Carrasco. Notable omissions include the Egyptian Lover and Kurtis Mantronik, both of whom were unavailable to be interviewed at the time of the movie's production. It is narrated by Zane Lowe.

Production 
According to an interview by Billboard, Alex Noyer noted that the film started production with Noyer, director Alexander Dunn and Arthur Baker  heading to Winter Music Conference in March 2012. The idea for the film came to Noyer after a nostalgic discussion about 808 classics with Arthur Baker in late 2011 in London. In October 2014, Alex Noyer's You Know Films, Atlantic Films and record producer and DJ Arthur Baker announced the film, as well as its soundtrack and remix album to be released as well by Big Beat/Atlantic Records. On November 15, 2016, You Know Films and Atlantic Films, a division of Atlantic Records, announced the film's release through Apple Music as well as the release of a new trailer.

Music 

The soundtrack for the film, 808: The Music, was released on November 25, 2016. It was promoted with a single, "Nothing but Trouble", on June 30, 2015.

Release 
The film premiered at South by Southwest on March 13, 2015. It was released on Apple Music exclusively on December 9, 2016, where pre-orders for the film started the same day. The film started a limited release on the same day at the Arena Cinema in Los Angeles. It was released for iTunes on December 16, 2016.

Reception 
The film holds a 100% critics' rating on Rotten Tomatoes.

References

External links 
 Official website

2015 films
Documentary films about musical instruments
American documentary films
2010s English-language films
2010s American films
English-language documentary films